Paolo Mosca (20 October 1943 – 30 November 2014) was an Italian journalist, writer, singer and television presenter.

Born in Pallanza, Mosca graduated in political science, and he attended the drama school of the Piccolo Teatro in Milan. He later started a career as a singer, and in  1964 he won  the  "B" section of  Cantagiro with the song "La voglia dell'estate".
 
In later years he dedicated himself to writing and journalism, and was director of magazines and newspapers, notably La Domenica del Corriere.

Mosca was also a playwright, and a television author and host, better known for the RAI late night show Il cappello sulle ventitré. He was the brother of the sport journalist Maurizio Mosca.

References

External links 
 
 Paolo Mosca at Discogs

1943 births
2014 deaths
People from Pallanza
20th-century Italian male writers
21st-century Italian male writers
Italian pop singers
Italian television journalists
Italian television writers
Italian television presenters
20th-century Italian  male singers
Italian male non-fiction writers
Male television writers